Acneiform eruptions are a group of dermatoses including acne vulgaris, rosacea, folliculitis, and perioral dermatitis. Restated, acneiform eruptions are follicular eruptions characterized by papules and pustules resembling acne.
The hybrid term acneiform, literally, refers to an appearance similar to acne.

The terminology used in this field can be complex, and occasionally contradictory. Some sources consider acne vulgaris part of the differential diagnosis for an acneiform eruption. Other sources classified acne vulgaris under acneiform eruption. MeSH explicitly excludes perioral dermatitis from the category of "acneiform eruptions", though it does group acneiform eruptions and perioral dermatitis together under "facial dermatoses".

See also 
 Drug eruption
 List of cutaneous conditions

References

External links